Paul Haynes may refer to:

 Paul Haynes (ice hockey) (1910–1989), Canadian ice hockey forward
 Paul Haynes (American football) (born 1969), American football coach
 Paul Haynes (basketball) (born 1982), American basketball player
 E. Paul Haynes (1918–1988), bishop of the Episcopal Diocese of Southwest Florida

See also
Paul Haines (disambiguation)